Ryad Boudebouz (born 19 February 1990) is a professional footballer who plays for Saudi First Division League club Al-Ahli. Mainly an attacking midfielder, he can also play as a right winger.

A former France youth international, Boudebouz switched his allegiance to Algeria in 2010. He played for the Algeria national team at the 2010 FIFA World Cup and the 2013 Africa Cup of Nations. In total, Boudebouz scored two goals in twenty-five matches for Algeria from 2010 to 2017.

Club career
Born in Colmar to Algerian parents, Boudebouz grew up in the 'Europe' district of the city. At age 10, he joined the junior ranks of local side Colmar where he stayed until age 14 when he joined Sochaux's youth academy. Boudebouz made his debut for the club's reserve side at the age of 16. On 15 May 2008, Boudebouz signed his first professional contract with the club agreeing to a three-year deal tying him to the club until 2011.

On 4 October 2008, Boudebouz made his first team debut for Sochaux, starting in a league match against Nice. On 8 November 2008, he scored his first career goal, the winner in a 2–1 victory against Le Mans.

On 2 September 2013 – the last day of the 2013–14 summer transfer window – Boudebouz signed a three-year contract with Corsica-based club SC Bastia, for a reported fee of €1 million.

After two seasons in Corsica, Boudebouz joined Montpellier with a four-year contract, as part of a deal that saw Yassine Jebbour join the Corsican team.

In January 2019, Boudebouz was loaned to Celta from Real Betis.

On 27 July 2019, Boudebouz signed a three-year deal to join Ligue 1 side Saint-Étienne which was reportedly worth €4 million. On 6 March 2020, he scored a stoppage time winner for Saint-Etienne in the Coupe de France semi-final to send the club into their first final in nearly 40 years.

On 8 September 2022, Boudebouz joined Saudi Arabian club Al-Ahli on a free transfer.

International career
Boudebouz received a surprise call-up to the France under-21 squad, who were looking to start fresh after their elimination from the 2009 UEFA European Under-21 Football Championship, for a friendly against Denmark. However, Ryad decided to pass on the offer instead opting to play with the under-19 team who were in the process of qualifying for the 2009 UEFA European Under-19 Football Championship, in which they later progressed.

On 4 May 2010, Boudebouz was named to the Algeria national team 2010 World Cup preliminary squad. Boudebouz had been in the process of acquiring a passport to represent the nation of his parents since 2009. On 28 May 2010, Boudebouz made his debut for Algeria in a friendly against the Republic of Ireland. Starting the game on the bench, he was substituted in at the 65th minute. He was included in the final 23-man squad for the World Cup.

Career statistics

Club

International

International goals
Scores and results list Algeria's goal tally first.

Honours  
Saint-Étienne

 Coupe de France runner-up: 2019–20

References

External links
 
 
 

1990 births
Living people
Sportspeople from Colmar
Chaoui people
French sportspeople of Algerian descent
French footballers
Algerian footballers
Association football midfielders
Ligue 1 players
FC Sochaux-Montbéliard players
SC Bastia players
Montpellier HSC players
AS Saint-Étienne players
La Liga players
Real Betis players
RC Celta de Vigo players
Saudi First Division League players
Al-Ahli Saudi FC players
2010 FIFA World Cup players
2013 Africa Cup of Nations players
Algeria international footballers
France youth international footballers
Algerian expatriate footballers
Algerian expatriate sportspeople in Spain
Algerian expatriate sportspeople in Saudi Arabia
Expatriate footballers in Spain
Expatriate footballers in Saudi Arabia
Footballers from Alsace
French expatriate footballers
French expatriate sportspeople in Spain